In enzymology, a 3-galactosyl-N-acetylglucosaminide 4-alpha-L-fucosyltransferase is an enzyme that catalyzes the chemical reaction

GDP-beta-L-fucose + beta-D-galactosyl-(1->3)-N-acetyl-D-glucosaminyl-R  GDP + beta-D-galactosyl-(1->3)-[alpha-L-fucosyl-(1->4)]-N-acetyl-beta-D- glucosaminyl-R

Thus, the two substrates of this enzyme are GDP-beta-L-fucose and [[beta-D-galactosyl-(1->3)-N-acetyl-D-glucosaminyl-R]], whereas its 3 products are GDP, [[beta-D-galactosyl-(1->3)-[alpha-L-fucosyl-(1->4)]-N-acetyl-beta-D-]], and glucosaminyl-R.

This enzyme participates in 3 metabolic pathways: glycosphingolipid biosynthesis - lactoseries, glycosphingolipid biosynthesis - neo-lactoseries, and glycan structures - biosynthesis 2.

Nomenclature 

This enzyme belongs to the family of glycosyltransferases, specifically the hexosyltransferases.  The systematic name of this enzyme class is GDP-L-fucose:3-beta-D-galactosyl-N-acetyl-D-glucosaminyl-R 4I-alpha-L-fucosyltransferase. Other names in common use include:

 (Lea)-dependent (alpha-3/4)-fucosyltransferase,
 alpha(1,3/1,4) fucosyltransferase III,
 alpha-(1->4)-L-fucosyltransferase,
 alpha-4-L-fucosyltransferase,
 beta-acetylglucosaminylsaccharide fucosyltransferase,
 FucT-II,
 Lewis alpha-(1->3/4)-fucosyltransferase,
 Lewis blood group alpha-(1->3/4)-fucosyltransferase,
 Lewis(Le) blood group gene-dependent,
 alpha-(1->3/4)-L-fucosyltransferase,
 blood group Lewis alpha-4-fucosyltransferase,
 blood-group substance Lea-dependent fucosyltransferase,
 guanosine diphosphofucose-beta-acetylglucosaminylsaccharide,
 4-alpha-L-fucosyltransferase,
 guanosine diphosphofucose-glycoprotein 4-alpha-L-fucosyltransferase,
 guanosine diphosphofucose-glycoprotein 4-alpha-fucosyltransferase,
 3-alpha-galactosyl-N-acetylglucosaminide,
 4-alpha-L-fucosyltransferase,
 GDP-beta-L-fucose:3-beta-D-galactosyl-N-acetyl-D-glucosaminyl-R, and 4I-alpha-L-fucosyltransferase.

References 

 
 
 
 

EC 2.4.1
Enzymes of unknown structure